Hospital de Órbigo is a municipality located in the province of León, Castile and León, Spain. According to the 2010 census (INE), the municipality had a population of 1,031 inhabitants.

It is a stopping point along the Camino de Santiago and has a long stone medieval bridge, which was recently restored. The town itself is part of the community of Puente de Órbigo, puente meaning bridge.

History 

During the Middle Ages there was a small village along the left side of the Órbigo River with a small church dedicated to the Virgin Mary, called Puente de Órbigo. In the 16th century the Knights Hospitaller established a pilgrim hospital on the right side of the river that came to be called Hospital de Órbigo.

The town was a battle site in 456 between forces loyal to Theuderic I and Rechiar.  Due to the bridge it was also important during the battles during Spain's Reconquista with Almanzor passing through the town at least once. Closer to the modern era in the 19th century, the town's inhabitants destroyed their iconic bridge  to slow the advance of Napoleon's forces into Spain.

Tournament of 1434 
In 1434, the Leonese knight Suero de Quiñones held a tournament in which he or one of his companions challenged all men of equal rank who wished to cross the bridge here to a jousting tournament, Suero holding this bridge in the name of unrequited love. By 1434 the skill of jousting was not a standard part of military training but the challenge was taken seriously. The tournament lasted from July 11 until 9 August and Don Suero claimed to have broken 300 lances by the end. Twenty four years later Suero de Quiñones was killed by Gutierre de Quijada, a knight he had beaten at the 1434 tournament.

References

Municipalities in the Province of León